Anna Journey (born November 1980 in Arlington, Virginia) is an American poet and essayist who was awarded a 2011 National Endowment for the Arts Fellowship for Poetry. She is the author of the essay collection An Arrangement of Skin (Counterpoint Press, 2017) and three books of poems: The Atheist Wore Goat Silk (Louisiana State University Press, 2017), Vulgar Remedies (Louisiana State University Press, 2013), and If Birds Gather Your Hair for Nesting (University of Georgia Press, 2009), the latter of which was selected by Thomas Lux for the National Poetry Series. She teaches creative writing and literature at the University of Southern California, where she is an assistant professor of English.

Life
She graduated from Virginia Commonwealth University with an MFA in creative writing.
She taught at Virginia Commonwealth University and served as an associate editor for Blackbird. She earned her Ph.D. in literature and creative writing from the University of Houston, where she served as a poetry editor for Gulf Coast.

Journey is the author of the poetry collection If Birds Gather Your Hair for Nesting (Georgia, 2009), which was selected by Thomas Lux for the National Poetry Series. Film director David Lynch called her book, via Twitter, "magical." Her poetry appears in American Poetry Review, Kenyon Review, FIELD, Gulf Coast, Indiana Review, Shenandoah, Gulf Coast, and Blackbird.

Her critical essay on Sylvia Plath ("'Dragon Goes to Bed With Princess': F. Scott Fitzgerald's Influence on Sylvia Plath") appears in Notes on Contemporary Literature. Her essay, "Lost Vocabularies: On Contemporary Elegy" appears in Parnassus: Poetry in Review. In 2006, Journey discovered the unpublished status of Plath's early sonnet "Ennui" that was published in Blackbird.

She is married to poet David St. John and lives in Venice, California.

Awards
 2005 Sycamore Review Wabash Prize for Poetry
 Yaddo residency
 2005 Wabash Prize for Poetry
 Academy of American Poets' Prize
 2007 Diner Poetry Contest
 2008 National Poetry Series
 2011 National Endowment for the Arts Fellowship for Poetry

Bibliography

Poetry 
Collections

 The atheist wore goat silk (Louisiana State University Press, 2017)
 The Judas ear, 2022

List of poems

Non-fiction 
"Review: The World in Repair: Steve Gehrke's The Pyramids of Malpighi", Blackbird, Spring 2005
"Dragon Goes to Bed with Princess: F. Scott Fitzgerald’s Influence on Sylvia Plath", Notes on Contemporary Literature, 09/01/07 
 An Arrangement of Skin (Counterpoint Press, 2017)

Critical studies and reviews of Journey's work
''If birds gather your hair for nesting

References

External links
Official website
 "How Do You Bottle the Lightning?: Anna Journey sits down with David Wojahn", Gulf Coast

1980 births
Living people
21st-century American poets
21st-century American women writers
American women academics
American women poets
People from Arlington County, Virginia
The New Yorker people
Virginia Commonwealth University alumni
Virginia Commonwealth University faculty